"Separate Lives" is a 1985 song recorded by Phil Collins and Marilyn Martin and featured on the soundtrack to the motion picture White Nights. It reached No. 1 on the US Billboard Hot 100 and Adult Contemporary charts as well as in Canada and Ireland. It reached No. 4 on the UK Singles Chart, and was certified silver by the British Phonographic Industry.

Songwriter Stephen Bishop recorded his own version for his album Sleeping with Girls for Polydor Records, released in 1985. Bishop received an Oscar nomination for Best Original Song in 1986. It lost to Lionel Richie's song "Say You, Say Me" from the same film.

Collins recorded other versions of "Separate Lives" while on tour. He sang with touring singer Amy Keys in 1994, the song appearing on the album Live from the Board. Beginning in 1997 he has performed the song many times with Italian singer Laura Pausini. In 2004, Collins recorded a version with Bridgette Bryant who had toured with him in 1990 in support of ...But Seriously.

Music video
The music video features Martin and Collins singing and playing the piano, intercut with scenes from the movie. It was edited to make it appear that Phil and Marilyn were in the same building as the movie's stars, Mikhail Baryshnikov and Gregory Hines, but in a separate studio. It was directed by Jim Yukich and produced by Paul Flattery of FYI. The film's director, Taylor Hackford, was also at the shoot.

Chart history

Weekly charts

Year-end charts

All-time charts

Personnel
 Phil Collins – vocals, drums
 Marilyn Martin – vocals
 Nick Glennie-Smith – keyboards
 Daryl Stuermer – guitar

See also 
 List of number-one adult contemporary singles of 1985 (U.S.)

References

 The Billboard Book of Top 40 Hits, 6th Edition, 1996

1985 singles
1985 songs
Phil Collins songs
Stephen Bishop (singer) songs
Billboard Hot 100 number-one singles
Cashbox number-one singles
RPM Top Singles number-one singles
Male–female vocal duets
Pop ballads
Rock ballads
Songs written for films
Song recordings produced by Arif Mardin
Song recordings produced by Phil Collins
Atlantic Records singles
Virgin Records singles
Warner Music Group singles